A building control body is an organisation authorised to control building work that is subject to the Building Regulations in England and Wales (similar systems are provided in Northern Ireland, and in Scotland where the term 'building standards' is used. Such regulations or standards are also known as building codes in other parts of the world.

Building control roles are exercised by public officers within local authorities and by private sector Approved Inspectors, licensed by CICAIR Ltd, a body authorised by the Secretary of State for Housing, Communities and Local Government under the Building Act 1984 (as amended). Local Authority Building Control (LABC) is the organisation representing all local authority building control functions in England and Wales.

The title "building control officer" (BCO) (also known as a "building inspector" or a "building control surveyor") is used predominantly by local authorities, which confer the title of "officer" to many staff who have regulatory, supervision or enforcement roles.

In 2021, the House of Commons has been considering a draft Building Safety Bill which will implement post Grenfell Tower fire inquiry recommendations for better safety in the erection of future higher-risk buildings, and better management of all existing (and all still under construction) higher-risk block of flats and student accommodation (over six floors or 18m above ground level).

Qualifications and appointment
Building control professionals practice in the public sector with local authorities or in the private sector as companies or individuals who are recognised as Approved Inspectors. Many individuals are members of the Royal Institution of Chartered Surveyors (RICS) and chartered building surveyors or chartered building control surveyors, and are members of that RICS Faculty; alternatively, they may be chartered members of the Chartered Institute of Building or the Chartered Association of Building Engineers.  

Approved Inspectors are bodies or individuals who must be appointed by an organisation designated by the Secretary of State for Housing, Communities and Local Government or the equivalent Welsh Government Minister as having the authority to control building work. CICAIR Limited, a specially created wholly owned subsidiary of the Construction Industry Council, is the sole body authorised to approve Approved Inspectors to undertake building control work in England and Wales.

In July 2019, there were 95 Approved Inspectors operating in the UK, but rising insurance premiums following the Grenfell disaster meant some could be forced out of business.

Functions
The main function of building control is to ensure that the requirements of the building regulations are met in all types of non-exempt development. Generally they examine plans, specifications and other documents submitted for approval, and survey work as it proceeds. Most building control surveyors are now actively involved at design stage for many schemes and are acknowledged to provide valuable input at all stages of development.

Many building control surveyors who work for local authorities are involved with other legislation such as safety at sports grounds, dealing with dangerous structures and demolitions, and various development and building matters.

Local authorities have powers under the Building Act 1984 to enforce the building regulations and have work altered or removed that does not comply. These powers have not been conferred on approved inspectors.

Organisations
Local Authority Building Control (LABC) is a membership association for around 3,000 members of local authority building control teams in England and Wales. LABSS (Local Authority Building Standards Scotland) is a not-for-profit membership organisation representing all local authority building standards verifiers in Scotland.

Formed in 1996, the Association of Consultant Approved Inspectors (ACAI) promotes private sector building control as a commercial, professional and cost-effective alternative to local authority inspectors.

The ACAI and LABC joined with the CABE, CIOB and RICS to form the Building Control Alliance, incorporated in 2008.

See also
Building regulations approval
Building regulations in the United Kingdom
Energy efficiency in British housing
Planning permission in the United Kingdom

Notes and references

External links
The Building Regulations 2010 (SI 2010/2214)
The Building (Approved Inspectors etc) Regulations 2000 (SI 2000/2532)
The Building and Approved Inspectors (Amendment) Regulations 2006 (SI 2006/652)

Housing in the United Kingdom
Building engineering
Construction
Architecture occupations
British civil servants
Home inspection